Lorenzo Colombo (born 13 September 2000) is an Italian racing driver currently competing for Prema Orlen Team in the FIA World Endurance Championship. He previously raced in the 2021 FIA Formula 3 Championship with Campos Racing. He is the son of former Formula 1 driver Alberto Colombo

Formula Racing

Karting
Born in Legnano, Colombo started his karting career in 2009. He predominantly competed in Italy, highlight of his karting career finishing second in the Andrea Margutti Trophy in 2018.

Lower formulae
In 2016 the Italian made his car racing debut in the Italian F4 Championship, driving for BVM Racing, where he finished 12th in the standings, having scored one podium at Imola.  

Colombo continued to race in the Italian F4 Championship in 2017, partnering Leonardo Lorandi and Sebastián Fernández at Bhaitech. He would end up finishing third in the standings with two victories and 223 points.  

He also made a one-off appearance in the ADAC Formula 4 Championship that same year, scoring no points as he was a guest driver.

At the end of 2018 Colombo made a one-off appearance for R-ace GP in Italian F4, which yielded three points in three races.

Formula Renault Eurocup

2018 

In 2018 Colombo made his debut in the Formula Renault Eurocup for JD Motorsport. He scored two pole positions and finished 6th in the standings.

2019 
The year after Colombo moved to MP Motorsport in his pursuit of winning the series. However, he didn't manage to do so, and with three race wins and 214.5 points he ended up fourth in the championship.

2020 
In 2020, Colombo would switch to his former Formula 4 outfit, Bhaitech Racing. Despite missing the round in Spa due to a heavy nosebleed after a routine COVID-19 test, Colombo finished 5th in the drivers' standings, courtesy of a hattrick of victories in the final three races of the series' history.

FIA Formula 3 Championship 

Colombo progressed to the FIA Formula 3 Championship with Campos Racing, partnering László Tóth and Amaury Cordeel. His season started out relatively poorly, with no points finishes in the opening three rounds. At the fourth round in Budapest however Colombo managed to qualify the car in eleventh, putting him second on the grid for the first race thanks to the reversing of the top twelve in Qualifying. After maintaining position through the first seven laps, the Italian made a move on leader Jonny Edgar into the first corner, and as they were accelerating away the Brit lost power and Colombo took the race lead. He would hold on to cross the finish line in first place, but he was stripped of victory by a five-second penalty he was given due to having driven more than ten car lengths behind the Safety Car prior to the car turning its lights out for the restart. He made amends by winning race 1 of the next round at Spa-Francorchamps. Colombo would score his final top-ten finish in the first race in Sochi, ending up sixth. He finished the championship in 15th, scoring all of Campos' 32 points.

Sportscar racing

2022 - First success in WEC and ELMS 

On 12 January 2022, it was announced that Colombo would be racing for Prema Orlen Team in the LMP2 class in the FIA World Endurance Championship, partnering Louis Delétraz and former Formula One race winner Robert Kubica. The highlight of the team's debut season in the category came at the 24 Hours of Le Mans, where they finished second in class, which helped Colombo and his teammates to fifth in the championship.

That season, Colombo would also replace the injured and otherwise occupied Juan Manuel Correa in the European Le Mans Series. His tenure there was a success, as a pair of victories in the opening two rounds was followed up by another win in Barcelona. Prema ended up winning the teams' championship, with Colombo finishing third in the drivers' standings despite missing the final two races.

As a prize for his very competitive 2022 season, Colombo was invited to take part in Rookie Test to be held in Bahrain on the day after the last race of the season, where he was given the opportunity to drive the title-winning Ferrari 488 GTE Evo in the GTE Pro class.

Karting record

Karting career summary

Racing record

Racing career summary

† As Colombo was a guest driver, he was ineligible for points.
‡ Colombo was ineligible for points from the third round onwards.
* Season still in progress.

Complete Italian F4 Championship results
(key) (Races in bold indicate pole position) (Races in italics indicate fastest lap)

Complete Formula Renault Eurocup results
(key) (Races in bold indicate pole position) (Races in italics indicate fastest lap)

Complete FIA Formula 3 Championship results 
(key) (Races in bold indicate pole position; races in italics indicate points for the fastest lap of top ten finishers)

Complete FIA World Endurance Championship results 
(key) (Races in bold indicate pole position) (Races in italics indicate fastest lap)

* Season still in progress.

Complete European Le Mans Series results
(key) (Races in bold indicate pole position; results in italics indicate fastest lap)

Complete 24 Hours of Le Mans results

References

External links
 

2000 births
Living people
People from Legnano
Italian racing drivers
Italian F4 Championship drivers
ADAC Formula 4 drivers
Euroformula Open Championship drivers
Formula Renault Eurocup drivers
BVM Racing drivers
Bhaitech drivers
Campos Racing drivers
JD Motorsport drivers
R-ace GP drivers
MP Motorsport drivers
Sportspeople from the Metropolitan City of Milan
24 Hours of Le Mans drivers
FIA Formula 3 Championship drivers
FIA World Endurance Championship drivers
European Le Mans Series drivers
Prema Powerteam drivers
Karting World Championship drivers